Dan, Duke Wen of Zhou, commonly known as the Duke of Zhou, was a member of the royal family of the early Zhou dynasty who played a major role in consolidating the kingdom established by his elder brother King Wu. He was renowned for acting as a capable and loyal regent for his young nephew King Cheng, and for successfully suppressing the Rebellion of the Three Guards and establishing firm rule of the Zhou dynasty over eastern China. He is also a Chinese culture hero credited with writing the I Ching and the Book of Poetry, and establishing the Rites of Zhou.

Life

His personal name was Dan. He was the fourth son of King Wen of Zhou and Queen Tai Si. His eldest brother Bo Yikao predeceased their father (supposedly a victim of cannibalism); the second-eldest defeated the Shang Dynasty at the Battle of Muye around 1046 BC, ascending the throne as King Wu. King Wu distributed many fiefs to his relatives and followers and Dan received the ancestral territory of Zhou near present-day Luoyang.

Only three years after assuming power, King Wu died and left the kingdom to his young son King Cheng. The Duke of Zhou successfully attained the regency and administered the kingdom himself, leading to revolts not only from disgruntled Shang partisans but also from his own relatives, particularly his older brother Guan Shu. Within five years, the Duke of Zhou had managed to defeat the Three Guards and other rebellions and his armies pushed east, bringing more land under Zhou control.

The Duke of Zhou was credited with elaborating the doctrine of the Mandate of Heaven, which countered Shang propaganda that as descendants of the god Shangdi they should be restored to power. According to this doctrine, Shang injustice and decadence had so grossly offended Heaven that Heaven had removed their authority and commanded the reluctant Zhou to replace the Shang and restore order.

On a more practical level, the Duke of Zhou expanded and codified his brother's feudal system, granting titles to loyal Shang clansmen and even establishing a new holy city at Chengzhou around 1038 BC. Laid out according to exact geomantic principles, Chengzhou was the home of King Cheng, the Shang nobility, and the nine tripod cauldrons symbolic of imperial rule, while the Duke continued to administer the kingdom from the former capital of Haojing. Once Cheng came of age, the Duke of Zhou dutifully gave up the throne without trouble.

Legacy
The duke's eight sons all received land from the king. The eldest son received Lu; the second succeeded to his father's fief, Zhou.

In later centuries, subsequent emperors considered the Duke of Zhou a paragon of virtue and honored him with posthumous names. The empress Wu Zetian named her short-lived 8th-century Second Zhou Dynasty after him and called him the Honorable and Virtuous King (Bāodé Wáng). In 1008, the Zhenzong Emperor gave the Duke the posthumous title King of Exemplary Culture (s , t , Wénxiàn Wáng). He was also known as the First Sage (s , t , Yuán Shèng).

In 2004, Chinese archaeologists reported that they may have found his tomb complex in Qishan County, Shaanxi.

God of Dreams
Duke of Zhou is also known as the "God of Dreams". The Analects record Confucius saying, "How I have gone downhill! It has been such a long time since I dreamt of the Duke of Zhou." This was meant as a lamentation of how the governmental ideals of the Duke of Zhou had faded, but was later taken literally. In Chinese legends, if an important thing is going to happen to someone, the Duke  of Zhou will let the person know through dreams: hence the Chinese expression "Dreaming of Zhou Gong". Zhou Gong's Explanations of Dreams (Chinese: 周公解夢, pinyin: Zhōu gōng jiěmèng) is attributed to him.

Descendants
The main line of the Duke of Zhou's descendants came from his firstborn son, the State of Lu ruler Bo Qin's third son Yu whose descendants adopted the surname Dongye. The Duke of Zhou's offspring held the title of Wujing Boshi (五經博士; Wǔjīng Bóshì). One of the Duke of Zhou's 72 generation descendants family tree was examined and commented on by Song Lian.

Duke Huan of Lu's son through Qingfu was the ancestor of Mencius. He was descended from Duke Yang of the State of Lu 魯煬公 Duke Yang was the son of Bo Qin, who was the son of the Duke of Zhou. The genealogy is found in the Mencius family tree.

The Zhikou Jiangs (also romanized as "Chiangs") such as Chiang Kai-shek were descended from Jiang Shijie who during the 17th century moved there from Fenghua District, whose ancestors in turn came to southeastern China's Zhejiang province after moving out of Northern China in the 13th century CE. The 12th-century BCE Duke of Zhou's third son was the ancestor of the Jiangs.

See also
 Family tree of ancient Chinese emperors

References

Citations

Works cited
 Bushin, Nikita (2022) The Duke of Zhou's Interpretations of Dreams. Auckland, NZ: Purple Cloud Press

External links
Tomb of Zhou Gong

Zhou dynasty nobility
Regents of China
Chinese dukes
Politicians from Shaanxi
11th-century BC Chinese people
Deified Chinese people